Namma Basava is a 2005 Indian Kannada language film directed by Veera Shankar Bairisetty. It stars Puneeth Rajkumar and Gowri Munjal (in her debut) in the lead roles. Avinash, Sudha Rani, Kota Srinivasa Rao, Riyaz Khan and M. N. Lakshmi Devi feature in supporting roles. Gurukiran scored music for the film's background and soundtrack.

Although the film saw an average performance commercially, it completed a 100-day run in 25 centers across Karnataka. While critics gave it mixed reviews, the film's soundtrack album was generally received well. Hindustan Times rated its soundtrack album the fifth best in Kannada films of 2005.

Plot
Basava runs a gym and lives with his brother and sister-in-law, who treat him as their own son. He is permanently opposed by competitors. When his brother start seeking a girl as his bride, he opines that he should select his future bride. He selects Gowri, daughter of an auditor who is working with Pampapathy. Pampapathy's son is the Home Minister of the State and whose son is a vagabond womanizer. To gain her approval, Basava makes every effort, but before he can get her approval, her engagement is fixed with the Pampathy's son. Supported by Gowri's peppy and naughty grandmother, Basava rises against the autocratic behaviour of Pampapathy, challenges him in public, and wins, thereby also winning the heart and hand of Gowri.

Cast

Soundtrack

Gurukiran  scored the film's background music and composed its soundtrack, lyrics for which was penned by Kaviraj, V. Manohar, Bhangi Ranga and K. Kalyan. The soundtrack album consists of six tracks. The tracks "Rukku Rukku Rukkamma" and "Myna Kooge" featured lyrics in more than one language including Kannada.

Reception 
Film critic R. G. Vijayasarathy of Rediff.com gave the film a positive review and opined that "despite the clichéd story, the ... movie manages to engage the viewer's attention, thanks to the fast pace of the film." He felt the film's plot resembled that of Thunta, another Kannada film that was released earlier in 2005, but "the director manages to get the right masala mix to serve up an entertaining film." He added, "Puneet excels as the action hero. Gowri, in her debut Kannada film, ... is just ordinary in the acting department but looks good in the song sequences. Kota Srinivasa Rao, Sudharani and Tara prove that they are perfect choices for the characters that portray. Dattu's photography, songs and fights are top class, but Guru Kiran's music does not rise to the expectations." B. S. Srivani of Deccan Herald gave a mixed review and wrote, "Puneeth has grown in confidence with each film. His dialogue delivery though, needs some help. Gauri looks pretty. Sudharani and Avinash are good. One can't fathom why Tara chose to play such a minuscule role." Of other departments in the film, she commented, "What captures one's attention is the sets erected by art director Arun Sagar. Gurukiran seems to be inspired to give his best whenever he provides the musical score for a Puneeth movie. But one of the tunes, a straight lift from a Telugu film is like a fly in the soup." She concluded praising the stunt sequences in the film while adding that it reminded her of the stunts in Mission: Impossible 2. Viggy.com felt that "loudness of a 'typical' Telugu film reflects throughout" the film. The reviewer wrote praises of the acting performances of the lead pair, the music, cinematography, and the art direction and stunts. The reviewer for IndiaGlitz echoed this view while adding that the direction was "good in bits and pieces".

References

External links 
 

2005 films
2000s Kannada-language films
Films scored by Gurukiran
2000s masala films
Films shot in Bangalore
Films shot in Vienna